Roberto Martínez Rípodas (born 15 September 1976), known as Tiko, is a Spanish retired professional footballer who played as a central or a defensive midfielder, and is the assistant manager of CD Basconia.

He was known for his powerful shots and creative play, his long-range efforts being dubbed Tikotazo. Over 12 professional seasons he played mainly for Athletic Bilbao, appearing in 230 official games for his main club (nearly 200 in La Liga) and scoring 26 goals.

Club career
Born in Pamplona, Navarre, Tiko emerged through the ranks of hometown club CA Osasuna, alternating between the A and B-sides for some time, with the former competing in the second division. His professional debut came on 10 May 1997, as he scored an injury time-winner away against CD Badajoz (1–0).

In 1999–2000, Tiko signed with neighbours Athletic Bilbao, making his La Liga debut on 12 October 1999 in a 4–3 away victory over Málaga CF. He made 20 appearances all competitions comprised during the campaign, netting once.

From 2001 to 2006, Tiko was an undisputed starter in midfield for the Basques, often scoring from free kicks and dictating his team's play. In his final two seasons he was severely hampered by injuries and the emergence of Carlos Gurpegui and Javi Martínez, playing only a combined seven league matches.

In August 2008, deemed surplus to requirements, Tiko joined second level side SD Eibar on a one-year loan deal. He was immediately released upon his return to Athletic following the former's relegation, and retired from the game shortly after at the age of 33.

After his playing days ended, Tiko embarked on a career as a coach. In 2015, he joined the staff of Athletic Bilbao's reserves under former Osasuna teammate José Ángel Ziganda; in
2017 he became assistant manager of CD Basconia (the former club's farm team), working with Ander Alaña.

International career
Tiko topped a successful 2001–02 season (32 games, seven goals) with his sole cap for Spain, playing in a friendly with the Netherlands on 27 March 2002 as the nation lost 0–1 in Rotterdam.

Personal life
Tiko's younger brother, Francisco, was also a footballer and a midfielder. He played exclusively in the lower leagues, also representing Osasuna B.

Tiko's uncle Patxi was also involved in the sport, also playing as a midfielder and also beginning his career at Osasuna before moving to Athletic Bilbao.

References

External links
 
 
 
 

1976 births
Living people
Footballers from Pamplona
Spanish footballers
Association football midfielders
La Liga players
Segunda División players
Segunda División B players
CA Osasuna B players
CA Osasuna players
Athletic Bilbao footballers
SD Eibar footballers
Spain international footballers
Basque Country international footballers
Athletic Bilbao non-playing staff